Religion in Barbados is predominantly Christian. Religious freedom is established by law and generally enforced in practice, although some minority religious groups have complaints about  government practices that interfere with their beliefs.

Religious affiliations 1970 and 2010

The reference work Religions of the World provides the following data for Barbados:

Although Roman Catholics are missing from the above chart, the same reference book gives their percentage as 4 percent in 1980 and 4.2 percent in 2000.

The Rastafarian Movement was introduced to Barbados in 1975.

Religious freedom 
The constitution of Barbados provides for the freedom of religion and prohibits discrimination based on creed.

There is a law against "blasphemous libel" but it is unenforced.

Religious groups are allowed to establish private schools and provide religious instruction, with some support from the government.

Religious groups are not required to register with the government, but may do so for tax purposes.

Rastafarians are unable to perform some religious rituals due to the illegality of cannabis. Representatives of the community have also objected to mandatory vaccinations for schoolchildren, and reported that Rastafarians face disproportionate scrutiny at security checkpoints, as well as facing some social discrimination.

Muslims in Barbados have objected to being forced to pose without head coverings for identification and passport photographs. According to the government, these measures are purely for security reasons.

See also
Anglican Church of Barbados
Bahá'í Faith in Barbados
Barbadian Jews
Hinduism in Barbados
Islam in Barbados
Methodism in Barbados
Roman Catholic Church in Barbados

References